High Heels is a 1918 Australian short silent film directed by P. J. Ramster. It was his first film.

It is considered a lost film.

References

External links
High Heels at National Film and Sound Archive

1918 films
Australian drama films
Australian silent short films
Australian black-and-white films
Lost Australian films
1918 drama films
1918 lost films
Lost drama films
Silent drama films